Edward Valentine Brown (18 October 1891 – 8 December 1957) was an Australian rules footballer who played for St Kilda and Carlton in the Victorian Football League (VFL).

Family
The son of Mungo Brown (1861-1911), and Margaret Ann Brown (1863-1933), née Peel, Edward Valentine Brown was born in Bendigo on 18 October 1891.

He married Lucy Catherine Miller (1891-1980) in 1921. Their sons, Vincent (1922-1989), and John (1923-2007), also played for Carlton (117 games and 90 games, respectively).

Football

St Kilda
Ted Brown played with Ararat Football Club in 1911–13, 18 games, including premierships in the 1911 and 1912 Wimmera & District Football Association.
He played with Ararat on Wednesdays and in Ballarat on Saturdays.

Brown, who was brought up in Ballarat, was recruited to St Kilda from Caulfield. He couldn't establish a place in the St Kilda team and left at the year's end.

Carlton
He returned to the VFL in 1914, return to the league in 1914 and join Carlton. He had immediate success at Carlton and was a wingman in their 1914 premiership team, and a half-back flanker in their 1915 premiership team (his son, Vin Brown, was also a dual premiership player for Carlton).

Yarragon
He was captain-coach of the Yarragon Football Club, in the Central Gippsland Football Association, in 1921, 1922, and 1923; the team won the premiership in 1921.

Maffra
He was appointed captain-coach of Maffra Football Club in 1924.

Traralgon
He was cleared from Maffra to Traralgon in 1925, and played in Traralgon's 1925 premiership team. He played for Traralgon for four years – 1925 to 1928 – and was the team's captain-coach of the team in 1928.

Yea
He was cleared from Traralgon to Yea in 1930.

Military service
He joined the First AIF in January 1916, and was discharged on medical grounds in March 1917. He did not serve overseas.

Death
He died in Parkville, Victoria on 8 December 1957.

Footnotes

References
 Holmesby, Russell and Main, Jim (2007). The Encyclopedia of AFL Footballers. 7th ed. Melbourne: Bas Publishing.
 World War One Service Record: Edward Valentine Brown (16498), National Archives of Australia.

External links

Blueseum profile

1891 births
Australian rules footballers from Ballarat
St Kilda Football Club players
Carlton Football Club players
Carlton Football Club Premiership players
South Ballarat Football Club players
1957 deaths
Two-time VFL/AFL Premiership players